Sven Oftedal (3 June 1905 – 23 June 1948) was a Norwegian physician and politician, representing the Labour Party. He was Minister of Social Affairs in 1945 and 1945-1948 and a member of the Storting (1945-1948).

Biography
Oftedal was born at Stavanger in Rogaland, Norway. He was the son of Lars Oftedal (1877-1932) and Alice Stephansen (1877-1938). His father was  editor of Stavanger Aftenblad. His brother Christian Stephansen Oftedal (1907–1955) was a member of the Norwegian Parliament and  served as a member of the Norwegian Nobel Committee.

After graduating at the Stavanger Cathedral School in 1923, he went to the University of Oslo to study medicine.  He graduated Cand.med. in 1930.  He served at Stavanger Hospital from 1931 to 1932.  Oftedal established himself as a private practice doctor in Stavanger from 1933 to 1941. He was elected as member of Stavanger City Council from 1934 to 1940.
 
During the Occupation of Norway by Nazi Germany during World War II, his involvement in the resistance movement led to his arrest.  In 1941, he was sent to Grini detention camp. He was released but was arrested again in the fall of 1942. In February 1943 he was sent to the German concentration camp Sachsenhausen north of Berlin   and stayed there until  German capitulation in 1945. During his captivity, he made an effort to treat prisoner who were particularly prone to dysentery and pneumonia. Oftedal managed to obtain permission from the camp commander to obtain medicine for the prisoners. Regular drug deliveries arrived from both the Norwegian and Swedish Red Cross organizations.

After the liberation of Norway, Oftedal was Social Minister in Einar Gerhardsen's First Government in 1945 and in Einar Gerhard's Second Government from 1945 to 1948. He was elected to the Storting for the period 1945 to 1949 for Vest-Agder and Rogaland. In 1948, he died at 43 years of age as a result of a heart attack and was buried at Vestre gravlund in Oslo. A bust of Sven Oftedal was made by artist Per Palle Storm in 1950 and is located in Stavanger city center.

References 

1905 births
1948 deaths
Politicians from Stavanger
Physicians from Oslo
University of Oslo alumni
20th-century Norwegian physicians
Government ministers of Norway
Members of the Storting
Labour Party (Norway) politicians
20th-century Norwegian politicians
Grini concentration camp survivors
Sachsenhausen concentration camp survivors
Burials at Vestre gravlund
Norwegian general practitioners